= Fruntimmersföreningen i Helsingfors =

Fruntimmersföreningen i Helsingfors ('Helsinki Women's Society') is a women's charity association in Helsinki in Finland, founded in 1848.

The association was founded by a group of upper-class women under the leadership of baroness Elisabet Klinkowström, who became its first chairperson. Its purpose was to provide help to poor people in Helsinki, particularly women, caused by the growing industrialization. This was also a period in time when it became the fashion of women to start associations and conduct public charity. Its role model was similar associations in Sweden, where many cities had women's charity organisations named Fruntimmersföreningen ('Women's Association') formed by upper-class women with focus on charity. The organisation had contact with other societies of the same kind in Sweden, and others where founded around the cities of Finland.
